A rotation government is one of the ways of forming of a government in a parliamentary state. It is a government that, during its term, will see the individual holding the post of prime minister switch (or "rotate"), whether within the same political bloc or as part of a grand coalition. Israel has seen by far the most experience with such a governing arrangement. The government of Ireland is now in its first rotation agreement.

Usually, this alternation is guided by constitutional convention with tactical resignation of the first officeholder to allow the second to form a new government. Israel, which established the rotation mechanism in 1984, codified it in 2020.

, rotation governments have been formed in Ireland, Israel, Malaysia, North Macedonia, Romania, and Turkey. Successful rotations have only taken place in Israel (first with the rotation between Shimon Peres and Yitzhak Shamir, and second with the ascension of Yair Lapid to the office of the Prime Minister of Israel on 1 July 2022, fulfilling the agreement of his coalition government) and Ireland (with Leo Varadkar returning as Taoiseach in December 2022); in all other cases, either the rotation has not yet taken place or the government has collapsed before it could occur. A rotation government was considered after the 2005 German federal election.

Greek mythology 
In the writings of Diodorus and the Bibliotheca of Pseudo-Apollodorus, Oedipus's sons Eteocles and Polynices agreed to share the kingship of Thebes, switching each year. When Eteocles's first year as king ended, he refused to give up the kingship, exiling Polynices, who found allies in Argos to retake the city, recounted in the events of Seven Against Thebes.

Germany 
After the 2005 German federal election, a rotation government between the CDU and the SPD was considered; under it, then-incumbent SPD Chancellor Gerhard Schröder would have continued to serve until 2007, at which point the CDU's Angela Merkel would take over for the remaining two years. The CDU rejected this and opted for a grand coalition without rotation, with Merkel holding the Chancellery for the entire term.

Ireland

After the 2020 Irish general election a coalition of Fianna Fáil, Fine Gael and the Green Party was formed on 27 June 2020 on the basis of a rotation government. Micheál Martin of Fianna Fáil became Taoiseach with an agreement that Leo Varadkar of Fine Gael would serve as his deputy (Tánaiste) until December 2022, when he would become Taoiseach. The rotation took place on 17 December 2022, with Varadkar sworn in for his second non-consecutive term as Taoiseach, and Martin taking the role of Tánaiste.

Israel
Israel was the first country to employ a rotation government ( memshelet rotatzia) in 1984, following the negotiations for the forming of a grand coalition government after the inconclusive 1984 election. The 1984 rotation deal was non-binding; de jure, the rotation government was two successive governments, one formed in 1984 and headed by Alignment's Shimon Peres and another formed in 1986 and headed by Likud's Yitzhak Shamir, but whose membership and portfolio distribution were otherwise identical. In addition, since the 1984 rotation government was formally two "ordinary" governments, the prime minister could unilaterally dismiss ministers from the alternate prime minister's bloc: In fact, Shimon Peres forced the  Likud finance minister, Yitzhak Moda'i, to resign, despite Shamir's objections.

In the 2015 Israeli legislative election, the Zionist Union originally floated the idea of forming an intra-party rotation government between its co-leaders Isaac Herzog and Tzipi Livni, in which Herzog would serve for the first two years and Livni for the second two, though Livni announced on 16 March 2015 that only Herzog would serve as prime minister of a Zionist Union-led government.

The idea of a rotation-based grand coalition again took hold during the 2019–2022 Israeli political crisis and the negotiations for the forming of the 35th Israeli government after the elections to the 23rd Knesset, but unlike in 1984, broad changes in the Basic Law: The Government were made to establish a legally-binding rotation, under a mechanism known as an "Alternation Government" ( memshelet chilufim). Under these changes, the initial prime minister's term automatically expires when the rotation time comes and he swaps positions with the alternate prime minister, without the need to form a de jure new government. Under the law, the alternate prime minister's status is legally entrenched - for example, the prime minister must obtain the approval of the alternate prime minister before removing ministers from the latter's bloc.

The first Alternation government was the 35th Israeli government, with the rotation being made between the Likud (Benjamin Netanyahu) and Blue and White (Benny Gantz). The two parties identified the rotation deal as a central part of their coalition agreement. The High Court of Justice heard a petition (brought by the Movement for Quality Government, Meretz, and others) challenging the Basic Law authorizing rotation agreements, but a nine-justice panel decided in 2021 that such agreements do "not amount to the denial of the basic democratic characteristics of the State of Israel" and that the judiciary thus could not intervene.

Under the agreement, Netanyahu was prime minister and Gantz was alternate prime minister. The two were to swap positions on November 17, 2021, after Netanyahu spent 18 months as PM. However, the scheduled rotation never occurred, because the government collapsed after six months, after Netanyahu maneuvered to sink the passage of the 2020 state budget, trigging new elections in March 2021; the move blocked Gantz from becoming PM.

The 36th Israeli government, a broad-based coalition government of eight parties formed after the 2021 Israeli legislative election, ousted Benjamin Netanyahu as prime minister. As part of the coalition agreement, the parties agreed that Yamina's Naftali Bennett would serve as prime minister of Israel for two years starting in 2021, while Yesh Atid's Yair Lapid was named as alternate prime minister and would take over as PM for two years starting right after 2023. After the coalition lost its majority, leading to its collapse, Bennett and Lapid announced new elections (the fifth Israeli elections in four years) on November 1, 2022. The Knesset formally dissolved on 30 June 2022; on the same day, in accordance with the 2021 agreement, Lapid became prime minister, serving in a caretaker capacity until the elections four months later.

Characteristics since 2020
In an alternation government, as established by the 2020 amendments to Basic Law: The Government, the alternate prime minister is an office held either by a member of the Knesset who is designated to serve as prime minister later in a government or a member of the Knesset who has already. served as the prime minister earlier in a government and has since rotated out of that position. The incumbent prime minister and alternate prime minister are sworn in together.

In the following cases, the alternate prime minister will replace the incumbent prime minister:
 the termination of the incumbent prime minister's term.
 the resignation of the incumbent prime minister from the position of prime minister
 the passing of the incumbent prime minister.
 the passing of 100 days, in which the incumbent prime minister has been incapacitated for health reasons only.
 the resignation of the incumbent prime minister from the Knesset.

The law stipulates that "the number of ministers identified as having an affinity for the prime minister will be equal to the number of ministers who are identified as having an affinity for the alternate prime minister; However, if the number of ministers shall not be equal, the government will establish a voting mechanism according to which the voting power of all the prime minister-affiliated ministers shall be equal to the voting power of all the alternate-prime minister-affiliated ministers, or rules on how decisions will be taken to ensure such a ratio." The alternate-prime minister shall be acting prime minister.

Some of the clauses in Basic Law: The Government dealing with the incumbent prime minister will also apply to the alternate prime minister, including  Clause 18 (d), which stipulates that the prime minister's term expires upon his conviction in a final judgment on an offense in which he is infamous. The Basic Law stipulates that when the prime minister is convicted as aforesaid, the alternate prime minister will replace him, and when the alternate prime minister is convicted as aforesaid, the government will not be deemed to have resigned.

Malaysia
In the campaign for the 2018 Malaysian general election, the then-opposition Pakatan Harapan announced that, if a PH-led government would be formed, Mahathir Mohamad would initially serve as its Prime Minister and secure a pardon for jailed opposition leader Anwar Ibrahim, and that the premiership would be subsequently yielded to Anwar Ibrahim after his release. While Anwar Ibrahim was released from prison on 16 May 2018, the planned rotation did not happen by the time of the collapse of the Mahathir-formed government on 1 March 2020.

North Macedonia
In the campaign for the 2020 North Macedonian parliamentary election, the Democratic Union for Integration made its participation in any coalition contingent on the nominee for Prime Minister being an ethnic Albanian, which both the Social Democratic Union of Macedonia and VMRO-DPMNE have refused. On 18 August, the SDSM and DUI announced that they had reached a deal on a coalition government as well as a compromise on the issue of an ethnic Albanian Prime Minister. Under the deal, SDSM leader Zoran Zaev will be installed as Prime Minister, and will serve in that position until no later than 100 days from the next parliamentary elections. At that time, the BDI will propose an ethnic Albanian candidate for Prime Minister, and if both parties agree on the candidate, that candidate will serve out the remaining term until the elections.

Romania
The Ciucă Cabinet is the first rotation government which took power in Romania, of which members are the PSD, PNL and UDMR. Assuming the coalition won't disband in the meantime, like with that of the preceding cabinet in a way that led to the 2021 Romanian political crisis, Nicolae Ciucă of PNL will occupy the position of Prime Minister until 2023. Then, the position would belong to the PSD until the next Romanian legislative elections in 2024.

Turkey
The 53rd government of Turkey was planned to be a rotation government between the True Path Party (DYP) and Motherland Party (ANAP), with the premiership alternating between the two parties every year. The vote of confidence was declared invalid by the Constitutional Court as an absolute majority of deputies was not obtained.

The 54th government of Turkey was planned to be a rotation government between the Welfare Party (RP) and DYP. Initially, Necmettin Erbakan of RP was the prime minister and Tansu Çiller of DYP was the deputy prime minister, with the rotation between the two taking place in 1997. When Erbakan resigned to ensure the rotation would take place, president Süleyman Demirel appointed Mesut Yılmaz of ANAP as the new prime minister instead.

See also
 The 1999 Indonesian presidential election (the power sharing pact between Abdurrahman Wahid and Megawati Sukarnoputri)
 The Granita Pact (the Blair–Brown deal)

References

 
Political science terminology